Veppampattu is one of the fastest developing suburban areas in Chennai City. It is Western part of the suburbs of the Metropolitan city Chennai in the Indian state of Tamil Nadu between Chennai and Arakkonam on the Chennai - Arakkonam railway line. It is fast-growing with a number of schools and colleges. Electric trains and NH 205 road provide transportation to Chennai. Veppampatu can be approached by both train and bus. Bus stop is a very nearby railway station. It is comes under Chennai Metropolitan Area.

Veppampattu can be approached by Lucas-Thiruvallur High Road or Poonamalle High Road next to Thiruninravur. Educational institutions and engineering colleges contribute to the development of Veppampattu. The next railway station is Thirunindravur.

The neighbourhood is served by the Veppampattu railway station of the Chennai Suburban Railway Network.

Demographics

As of 2011 India census, Veppampattu had a population of 20,456. Males constitute 50% of the population and females 50%. Veppampattu has an average literacy rate of 72%, higher than the national average, male literacy is 79%, and female literacy is 65%.

Banks

Veppampattu has banks with the following.

Buses

Veppampattu is well connected by road and rail. National Highroad 205 connecting Chennai and Anantpur in Andhra Pradesh.

MTC Services connecting Veppampattu:

Trains

Two fast local (vellore cantonment and Beach fast morning 9:40) trains will stop and normal EMU trains bound to Thiruvallur, Kadambathur, Thiruvalangadu, Arakkonam Junction and Tiruttani starting from Chennai Central and Chennai Beach Velachery halt at Veppampattu. Train timings between Chennai Central and Tirutani http://www.sr.indianrailways.gov.in/uploads/files/1345107817375-MASMSB-TRT%20%20up.pdf

Education institutions

Colleges

Sriram Engineering College.
Sriram College of Arts and Science.
Sriram Polytechnic college.
Bhajarang Engineering College.

Schools

Sriram Vidya mandir matriculation school.
Sriram Vidya mandir (CBSE) School.
Sri Aravindar Matriculation School.
Raja National Matriculation Higher Secondary School.
Carmel Public School.
Gnana Banu Matriculation School.
Government Higher Secondary School.
Sri Gomathi Vidyala.      
 Sri Mahalakashmi Vidyalaya  Metriculation School.

Nearby town

Perumalpattu, a village about 2 km from Veppampattu in South bound, is known for lush green scenery and comparatively untouched flora. 
Sevvapet Village, is about 2 km from Veppampattu in West bound, the population of the village increased highly in the last decade due to migration from other nearby villages as a result of the Housing Boarding scheme and it has oldest Government High School.

References

http://www.thehindu.com/features/friday-review/history-and-culture/shrines-for-sastha-in-eight-forms/article5425348.ece

Cities and towns in Tiruvallur district